Montrose Burghs by-election may refer to one several parliamentary by-elections held in Scotland for the British House of Commons constituency of Montrose Burghs:

 1842 Montrose Burghs by-election
 1855 Montrose Burghs by-election
 1896 Montrose Burghs by-election
 1908 Montrose Burghs by-election
 1932 Montrose Burghs by-election
 1940 Montrose Burghs by-election

See also 
 Montrose Burghs (UK Parliament constituency)